Stow Bardolph, sometimes simply referred to as Stow, is an estate and civil parish in the English county of Norfolk, lying between King's Lynn and Downham Market on the A10.

For the purposes of local government, it falls within the district of King's Lynn and West Norfolk. The parish includes Stowbridge and Barroway Drove.

History 
The village name evolved from the Old English stōw - place; a place of assembly; a holy place - to which was added the surname  Bardolf. This was almost certainly because of connections with the Lords Bardolf of nearby Wormegay Castle.

The Stow Bardolph estate was purchased by the Hare family in 1553. At least three Stow Halls have existed on the estate, the original was built around 1589 by Nicholas Hare, Master of the Rolls and Lord Keeper of the Great Seal, but fell into disrepair and was demolished. The second Stow Hall was built around 1796, but this too fell into disrepair and was demolished. The third Stow Hall was built around 1874 and served as a stately home until 1939. From 1940 to 1980 the house was used by the local health authority as a maternity hospital and was demolished in 1994 when it was found to be beyond economic repair.

Holy Trinity Parish Church was extensively restored by John Raphael Rodrigues Brandon around 1850. A wax effigy of the upper body of Sarah Hare including lifelike face and hands is displayed upright in a mahogany case in the Hare Chapel of the church.  Hare died from blood poisoning in 1744 at the age of 55. Her will stated she wished to be recreated in wax following her death. It is the only funerary effigy of its kind outside Westminster Abbey. There is a stained glass window to the memory of Victoria Cross recipient James Adams who was vicar here from 1896 to 1902.

The village is home to a Rare Breeds Centre called Church Farm which opened in 2004.

Education
The old rectory serves as a preparatory school and Montessori nursery which opened in 1984. The rectory was previously a maternity home.

Sport and leisure
The estate is home to the Stow Cricket Club and Croquet Club which were both re-reformed in 1991.

Notable residents
 Nicholas Hare (1484–1557), Speaker of the House of Commons 1539-1540
 Hare baronets, created in the Baronetage of England on 23 July 1641
 George Henry Dashwood (1801–1869), curate, then vicar 1852–1869 
 James Adams (1839–1903), vicar 1896–1902

Notes

External links

Village website
Church Farm Rare Breeds Centre

 
Villages in Norfolk
Civil parishes in Norfolk
King's Lynn and West Norfolk